Kadašman-Enlil I, typically rendered mka-dáš-man-dEN.LÍL in contemporary inscriptions (with the archaic masculine determinative preceding his name), was a Kassite King of Babylon from ca. 1374 BC to 1360 BC, perhaps the 18th of the dynasty. He is known to have been a contemporary of Amenhotep III of Egypt, with whom he corresponded (Amarna letters). This places Kadašman-Enlil securely to the first half of the 14th century BC by most standard chronologies.

Correspondence with Egypt
Five cuneiform tablets are preserved in the Amarna letters corpus. The letters designated EA (for El Amarna) 1 through 5 include three letters authored by Kadašman-Enlil and two by Amenhotep III, who is addressed as and calls himself Nibmuareya, or variants thereof (from Neb-Maat-Ra).
In the first letter from Amenhotep III, EA 1, he writes to assure Kadašman-Enlil that his sister, the daughter of Kurigalzu I, has not in fact died, nor had she been banished to a distant harem as a minor concubine, and to acknowledge the offer of one of Kadašman-Enlil’s daughters, to become, as yet another wife. He suggests Kadašman-Enlil dispatch a kamiru, tentatively translated as eunuch, to identify his sister, rather than the pair of envoys actually sent, on whom Amenhotep casts aspersions, describing one as a donkey-herder. The text is not entirely legible at this point, and the unfortunate envoy may actually be referred to as a caravan leader, and his companion a merchant, thus – these “nobodies” are merely common 'tradesmen' unfamiliar with the members of the royal household and thus unable to recognize Kadašman-Enlil’s sister.

In EA 2 he declares “my daughters are available (for marriage).”

In EA 3,  Kadašman-Enlil feigns offence about being overlooked for an invite to the isinnu festival. Disarmingly, however, he invites his “brother” (Pharaoh Amenhotep III) to his own inauguration. ‘Now I am going to have a grand opening for the palace. Come yourself to eat and drink with me. I shall not do as you did!”

In another of his letters, EA 4, Kadašman-Enlil complains to Amenhotep III about not being given one of his daughters as a wife, quoting Amenhotep’s earlier response that “since earliest times no daughter of the king of Egypt has ever been given in marriage [to anyone]”. He urges that if he could not receive a princess, then a beautiful woman should be sent, but immediately follows up by proposing to exchange one of his own daughters for gold, needed to fund a building project he had in mind.

In EA 5, Amenhotep writes to detail the long list of gifts that will be provided in exchange for Kadašman-Enlil’s daughter, and the deal is sealed.

Building works

Difficulties are encountered distinguishing between inscriptions belonging to Kadašman-Enlil I and his descendant Kadašman-Enlil II, who ruled around one hundred years later. Historians disagree on whether building inscriptions at Isin, for the Egalmaḫ of Gula, or in Larsa, on bricks bearing a sixteen-line inscription of the restoration of the Ebabbar temple for Šamaš, should be assigned to the earlier King. The inscriptions from Nippur which include stamped bricks from the east stairway of the ziggurat and elsewhere describing work on the Ekur, the “House of the Mountain” of Enlil, four inscribed slab fragments of red-veined alabaster, a five-line agate cameo votive fragment, an engraved stone door socket,  and so on, could be assigned in part to either King.

Length of reign

An economic tablet from Nippur is dated “15th year (of) Kadašman-Enlil, month of Tašrītu, 18th day”, and is ascribed to him, rather than his descendant name-sake, because of the more archaic use of the masculine personal determinative before the royal name (the single vertical cuneiform stroke), and the likelihood that the later king reigned for no more than nine years. Another one refers to the 1st year of Burra-Buriaš and the 15th of the preceding king, presumed to be Kadašman-Enlil.

His successor was his son, ascertained from an inscription on an irregular block of lapis lazuli found in Nippur and now housed in the İstanbul Arkeoloji Műzeleri,  the considerably more well-known Burna-Buriaš II, who also wrote several letters preserved in Egyptian archives to the Egyptian pharaoh (Amarna letters).

Inscriptions

References

14th-century BC Babylonian kings
Amarna letters writers
1360s BC deaths
Kassite kings
Year of birth unknown